Megan Slankard (born June 6, 1983, Tracy, California) is an American musician and singer-songwriter.

Early life
Slankard began learning the guitar when she was 10 years old. At age 17, Slankard produced and recorded her first album, Lady is a Pirate, with her brother at home on her computer.

Career
After turning 18, Slankard toured with David Knopfler as the opening act for his European tour and co-wrote the title song of his album Ship of Dreams.

In July 2004, Slankard appeared on an episode of TLC's What Not to Wear.  The episode first aired July 16, 2004.

Slankard's album Freaky Little Story appeared on the Acoustic Guitar 2004 Top 5 list and became a top ten seller on the Amazon CD sales chart. In 2005, she released the EP album A Little Extra Sun produced by Adam Rossi.

According to her web site, she was a semi-finalist in Discmaker's 2007 Independent Music World Series and International Songwriting Competition and finalist in the 2008 and 2009 Musician's Atlas/Borders Books Independent Music Awards.  She was the January 2009 Top 5 artist in the Famecast Competition. She released her album A Token of the Wreckage in 2011.

In July 2011, Slankard (composer, guitar, mandolin, vocals ), Joel Ackerson (composer, engineer, guitar, mandolin, vocals), Zack Teran (upright bass, vocals), and Eric Andersen (composer, piano, vocals) formed The Novelists, a Reno-based lyrical rock band. The four singer-songwriters collaborated to produce the band's debut album, "Backstory", released January 1, 2012.

Slankard's music has also been featured on San Francisco radio's KFOG compilation CD. She was a final selection artist for RPM Direct Presents: Unsigned Artists Volume 3 compilation CD; an A&R Online featured artist; a Song and Film Spotlight artist; and, an Acoustic Cafe featured artist on the “One to Watch” syndicated radio program (sponsored by the USA Songwriting Competition). 

Slankard was nominated for the 7th Annual Independent Music Awards for Folk/Singer Songwriter Song of the year for her song "The Happy Birthday". Slankard won the 8th annual Independent Music Awards Vox Pop award in the Best Cover Song category for her rendering of the song "America".

Personal life
Slankard appeared on an episode of TLC's What Not to Wear in July 2004 and in a follow up episode a year later.

Equipment
Slankard's preferred equipment includes:
Acoustic guitars: 1999 Guild D55 guitar, a 2000 Taylor 614ce guitar, and a Takamine C132S
 Electric guitar: Daisy Rock's Rock Candy Special 
 Keyboard: Korg Triton Extreme EXT61
 Home recording equipment: MOTU 828mkII; Digidesign Mbox 2 with Pro Tools LE

Discography

Studio albums
 Lady Is a Pirate (2001)
 Freaky Little Story (2003)
 A Token of the Wreckage (2011)
 Running on Machinery (2015)
 California & Other Stories (2022)

EPs and singles
 A Little Extra Sun (2005 EP)

Appearances on other albums and singles
 Stop and Go Jeff Campbell (2012)
 In Spite of Everything Jeff Campbell (2013)
 "The Kitchen Sink" Jeff Campbell (TBA)

External links
 Megan Slankard Official website
 Interview with Megan Slankard for Guitarbench.com

References

American women singer-songwriters
Living people
Singer-songwriters from California
1983 births
21st-century American singers
21st-century American women singers